Cape Pembroke is the easternmost point of the Falkland Islands, and is on East Falkland. There is an automated lighthouse here.

Lighthouse 

An automated  lighthouse on Cape Pembroke was built in 1855, and rebuilt in 1906, and was restored in the 1990s. Previously, the nearby Billy Rock offshore had claimed fifteen ships, and there were unlit markers here.

The original light used rape seed oil, but as it burnt a thousand gallons a year, sea lion oil was attempted as a substitute. When it was rebuilt in 1906, it was converted to paraffin and worked by clockwork. After World War II a less romantic structure was built to the east.

A small lighthouse keepers cottage used to stand here. The lighthouse itself is now a listed building.

Farm and James Smith 
In the late nineteenth century, Cape Pembroke peninsula was a small farm, which the islands' government leased to James Smith of Stanley. There were few such small farms in the islands and James Smith was ardent in his support of agrarian reform.

Atlantic Conveyor memorial 
Whilst under tow after the event, she sunk off the north eastern coast of the Falkland Islands.

Gallery

References

External links 
 

Pembroke, Cape
History of the Falkland Islands
Lighthouses in South America
Lighthouses completed in 1855
Lighthouses completed in 1906
1855 establishments in South America
1855 establishments in the British Empire